The Lotus Temple, located in Delhi, India, is a Baháʼí House of Worship that was dedicated in December 1986. Notable for its lotus like shape, it has become a prominent attraction in the city. Like all Bahá’í Houses of Worship, the Lotus Temple is open to all, regardless of religion or any other qualification. The building is composed of 27 free-standing marble-clad "petals" arranged in clusters of three to form nine sides, with nine doors opening onto a central hall with a height of slightly over 34 meters and a capacity of 1,300 people. The Lotus Temple has won numerous architectural awards and has been featured in many newspaper and magazine articles.

History
The architect of the Lotus Temple was an Iranian, Fariborz Sahba who now lives in La Jolla, California, after living some years in Canada. He was approached in 1976 to design the Lotus Temple and later oversaw its construction. The structural design was undertaken by the UK firm Flint and Neill over the course of 18 months, and the construction was done by ECC Construction Group of Larsen & Toubro Limited at a cost of $10 million. The major part of the funds needed to buy this land was donated by Ardishír Rustampúr of Hyderabad, Sindh (Pakistan), whose will dictated that his entire life savings would go to this purpose. A portion of the construction budget was saved and used to build a greenhouse to study indigenous plants and flowers that would be appropriate for use on the site.

Rúhíyyih Khánum laid the foundation stone for the Lotus Temple on 19 October 1977 and dedicated the temple on 24 December 1986. For the dedication, there was a gathering of 8,000 Baháʼís from 107 countries, including some 4,000 Baháʼís from 22 provinces in India. The temple was opened to the public on 1 January 1987 and more than 10,000 people visited that day.

Worship
The Baháʼí Faith teaches that a Baháʼí House of Worship should be a space for people of all religions to gather, reflect, and worship. Anyone may enter the Lotus Temple irrespective of religious background, gender, or other distinctions, as is the case with all Baháʼí Houses of Worship. The sacred writings of not only the Baháʼí Faith but also other religions can be read and/or chanted, regardless of language; on the other hand, reading nonscriptural texts is forbidden, as are delivering sermons or lectures, or fundraising. Musical renditions of readings and prayers can be sung by choirs, but no musical instruments can be played inside. There is no set pattern for worship services, and ritualistic ceremonies are not permitted.

Structure

All Baháʼí Houses of Worship, including the Lotus Temple, share certain architectural elements, some of which are specified by Baháʼí scripture. ʻAbdu'l-Bahá, the son of the founder of the religion, wrote that Baháʼí Houses of Worship must be nine-sided and circular. While all current Baháʼí Houses of Worship have a dome, this is not regarded as an essential part of their architecture. Baháʼí scripture also states that no pictures, statues or images be displayed within the House of Worship and no pulpits or altars be incorporated as an architectural feature (readers may stand behind simple portable lecture stands).

Inspired by the lotus flower, the design for the House of Worship in New Delhi is composed of 27 free-standing marble-clad "petals" arranged in clusters of three to form nine sides. The temple's shape has symbolic and inter-religious significance because the lotus is often associated with purity, sacredness, spirituality and knowledge. It has a spiritual significance in India. The nine doors of the Lotus Temple open onto a central hall 34.3 meters tall that can seat 1,300 people and hold up to 2,500 in all. The temple has a diameter of 70 m. The surface of the House of Worship is made of white marble from Penteli mountain in Greece, the same marble used in the construction of many ancient monuments (including the Parthenon) and other Baháʼí buildings. Along with its nine surrounding ponds and gardens, the Lotus Temple property comprises 26 acres (105,000 m2; 10.5 ha). An educational centre beside the temple was established in 2017.

The Lotus Temple is situated near Okhla NSIC and Kalkaji Mandir metro station is just 500 meters away. It is in the village of Bahapur in New Delhi, National Capital Territory of Delhi, near Nehru Place.

Of the temple's total electricity use of 500 kilowatts (kW), 120 kW is provided by solar power generated by solar panels on the building. This saves the temple ₹120,000 per month. It is the first temple in Delhi to use solar power.

As is the case with other stone monuments such as the Taj Mahal, the Lotus Temple is becoming discoloured due to air pollution in India. Specifically, the white marble is turning grey and yellow due to pollution from vehicles and manufacturing in the city, among other sources.

Visitors
By late 2001, The Lotus Temple had attracted more than 70 million visitors, according to Manpreet Brar, a CNN reporter. The permanent delegation of India to UNESCO stated that the Lotus Temple had received over 100 million visitors by April 2014.

The Lotus Temple has become a major attraction for people of various religions, with up to 100,000 visitors on some holidays. Estimates for the number of visitors annually range from 2.5 million to 5 million. Brar stated in 2001 that it was the "most visited building in the world". The Lotus Temple is often listed as one of Delhi's main tourist attractions.

Distinctions

The Temple has received a wide range of attention in professional architectural, fine art, religious, governmental, and other venues.

Awards
1987, the architect of the Baháʼí House of Worship, Fariborz Sahba, was presented the award for excellence in religious art and architecture by the UK-based Institution of Structural Engineers for producing a building "so emulating the beauty of a flower and so striking in its visual impact".

1987, the Interfaith Forum on Religion, Art and Architecture, Affiliate of the American Institute of Architects, Washington, D.C., gave their First Honour award for "Excellence in Religious Art and Architecture" 1987 to Fariborz Sahba for the design of the Baháʼí House of Worship near New Delhi.
1988, the Illuminating Engineering Society of North America conferred the Paul Waterbury Special Citation for Outdoor Lighting for the "Taj Mahal of the Twentieth Century"
1989, the Temple received an award from the Maharashtra-India Chapter of the American Concrete Institute for "excellence in a concrete structure".
1994 edition of Encyclopædia Britannica, in its "Architecture" section gives recognition to the Temple as an outstanding achievement of the time.
2000, Architectural Society of China as one of 100 canonical works of the 20th century in "World Architecture 1900-2000: A Critical Mosaic, Volume Eight, South Asia".
2000, GlobArt Academy, based in Vienna, Austria, presented its "GlobArt Academy 2000" award to the architect of the Lotus Temple, Fariborz Sahba, for "the magnitude of the service of [this] Taj Mahal of the 20th century in promoting the unity and harmony of people of all nations, religions and social strata, to an extent unsurpassed by any other architectural monument worldwide."

Publications

Articles
By 2003, the Baháʼí World Centre Library had archived more than 500 publications which carried information on the Lotus Temple in the form of articles, interviews with the architect and write-ups extolling the structure. The following are major examples of publications featuring articles on the temple listed chronologically, and excerpted quotations:
 Progressive Architecture, February 1987 and December 1987
 Architecture, September 1987
 Structural Engineer (annual UK journal), December 1987
 Encyclopaedia Iranica, 1989
 World Architecture: A Critical Mosaic 1900-2000, by Kenneth Frampton, Vol 8, 2000 - "A power icon of great beauty ... an import symbol of the city."
 Actualité des Religions (French magazine), Fall 2000 special edition entitled "Les religions et leurs chef-d'œuvres" (Religions and their Masterpieces), four-page article
 Guinness World Records, 2001
 Wallpaper*, October 2002
 Lighting Design + Application Vol 19, No. 6, Illuminating Engineering Society of North America - "Taj Mahal of the Twentieth Century"
 Faith & Form (journal of the Interfaith Forum on Religion, Art and Architecture, an affiliate of the American Institute of Architects), Vol XXI - "An extraordinary feat of design, construction, and appropriateness of expressions"
 BBC Travel, 2016, The world's most beautiful places of worship

Books
 Forever in Bloom: The Lotus of Bahapur, photographs by Raghu Rai and text by Roger White, Time Books International, 1992
 The Dawning Place of the Remembrance of God, Thomas Press, 2002

Arrests
In 2006, some former employees of the Lotus Temple made a complaint to the police that the trustees of the temple had been involved in various crimes including spying, religious conversion and producing false passports. The trial judge directed the police to arrest nine specific trustees, but the Delhi High Court later stayed the arrests.

Gallery

See also
Swaminarayan Akshardham (Delhi)
Baháʼí Faith in India
Baháʼí World Centre buildings
Prayer in the Baháʼí Faith
Other modern structures with similar designs:
Auditorio de Tenerife
Palau de les Arts Reina Sofia
Pakistan Monument
Sydney Opera House

Notes

References

Books

Encyclopedias

News media

Other

Further reading
 
 Naharoy, S. Architectural Blossoming of the Lotus
 Bahá'í News, June 1986, special issue about the Lotus Temple

External links

 Official Website

Bahá'í House of Worship
Buildings and structures in New Delhi
Religious buildings and structures completed in 1986
Bahá'í Faith in India
Temples in Delhi
20th-century architecture in India
World Heritage Tentative List for India